St. Luke's Hospital is a former general hospital located on Gwardamanġia hill, in  Pietà, Malta.

History
The hospital's foundation was laid on 5 April 1930 by the Governor of Malta, John Philip Du Cane, in the presence of then Prime Minister, Gerald Strickland. Progress in the construction of the hospital was slow due to technical difficulties encountered. By 1939, at the onset of the Second World War, the hospital was still incomplete and the work was suspended.

In 1941, the main block was converted into an isolation hospital for infectious diseases. The hospital, by then given the official title of St. Luke's Hospital, dealt with several epidemics ranging from measles to typhoid, typhus, poliomyelitis, scabies and ringworm.

By the late 1940s the hospital assumed its role as a general hospital with facilities for treating general medical, surgical, gynaecological and paediatric cases. In 1948 the radiology department was opened.

The hospital building is included in the National Inventory of the Cultural Property of the Maltese Islands.

University of Malta affiliation
The Hospital served students attending Medical and Health Sciences courses within the University of Malta. The former medical school still houses the depository of pre-1965 monographs and all back runs of medical and nursing journals.

Replacement
In June 2007, St. Luke's hospital ceased to be Malta's main general hospital, having been replaced by Mater Dei Hospital.

See also
List of hospitals in Malta

References 

Hospital buildings completed in 1939
Defunct hospitals in Malta
Pietà, Malta
National Inventory of the Cultural Property of the Maltese Islands
2007 disestablishments in Malta
1930 establishments in Malta